Schreiteria bruchi is a species of beetle in the family Cerambycidae. It was described by Melzer in 1933. It is known from Argentina.

References

Parmenini
Beetles described in 1933